This is a list of submissions to the 92nd Academy Awards for the Best International Feature Film. The Academy of Motion Picture Arts and Sciences (AMPAS) has invited the film industries of various countries to submit their best film for the Academy Award for Best International Feature Film every year since the award was created in 1956. The award is presented annually by the Academy to a feature-length motion picture produced outside the United States that contains primarily non-English dialogue. The International Feature Film Award Committee oversees the process and reviews all the submitted films. The category was previously called the Best Foreign Language Film, but this was changed in April 2019 to Best International Feature Film, after the Academy deemed the word "Foreign" to be outdated.

For the 92nd Academy Awards, the submitted motion pictures must be first released theatrically in their respective countries between 1 October 2018 and 30 September 2019. The deadline for submissions was 1 October 2019, with the Academy announcing a list of eligible films on 7 October 2019. A total of 94 countries submitted a film, with a record number of 93 being accepted. Three countries submitted a film for the first time. Ghana sent Azali, Nigeria sent Lionheart, and Uzbekistan sent Hot Bread. However, on 4 November 2019, the Academy disqualified Nigeria's entry, as the majority of the film's dialogue is in English.

From the longlist, ten finalists were shortlisted, with those ten films announced on 16 December 2019, with the final five nominees announced on 13 January 2020. Parasite by Bong Joon Ho won the award for South Korea, as well as the award for Best Picture, becoming the first non-English language film to do so.

Submissions

Notes
  Afghanistan's submission, Hava, Maryam, Ayesha, was not on the final list because questions were raised over the legitimacy of the national committee that submitted it.
  Austria's submission, Joy, was disqualified in November 2019, with the Academy stating that the film had too much of its dialogue in English. The filmmakers disputed the disqualification, arguing that dialogue in Nigerian Pidgin was unintelligible to English speakers without subtitles, and should be counted separately from standard English. Because standard English constituted less than 50% of the film's dialogue, the film should be eligible. The Academy stood by its initial decision. However, they changed the rules to allow films in Pidgin English the following year. 
  Lionheart from Nigeria, the first film ever submitted by the country, was disqualified in November 2019. Only 11 minutes of its 95-minute runtime featured non-English language dialogue, in violation of the Academy's rule that an entry's "original dialogue track as well as the completed picture must be predominantly in a language or languages other than English." Director Ava DuVernay criticized the Academy's rule and the film's disqualification saying, "English is the official language of Nigeria. Are you barring the country from ever competing for an Oscar in its official language?" The Academy's International Feature Film executive committee chairman  Larry Karaszewski said the rules were clearly communicated to the submitting international committees. He commented, "If you're submitting for something as important as an Academy Award, I would think you should look at the rules." The Nigerian selection committee responded, "Going forward, the committee intends to submit films which are predominantly foreign language — non-English recording dialogue."
  Initial reports stated that Uganda had selected Kony: Order from Above as their first-ever Oscar submission. However, the Uganda Oscars Selection Committee said that the film did not meet the minimum qualification requirements for selection and was not submitted.

References

External links
 Official website of the Academy Awards

2018 in film
2019 in film
92